In the run up to the 2019 Ukrainian presidential election, various organisations carried out opinion polling to gauge voting intention in Ukraine. The results of such polls are displayed in this article.

The date range for these polls are from the previous presidential election to 31 March 2019. On 26 November 2018, Ukraine's parliament set the presidential vote for 31 March 2019.

First round

Graphical summaries

Exit polls

2019 after candidates registration

2019 until candidates registration

2018

2017

2016

2015

2014

Second round

Exit polls

Zelenskyy vs Poroshenko

Zelenskyy vs Tymoshenko

Zelenskyy vs Boyko

Zelenskyy vs Hrytsenko

Zelenskyy vs Vakarchuk

Poroshenko vs Tymoshenko

Poroshenko vs Boyko

Poroshenko vs Hrytsenko

Poroshenko vs Vakarchuk

Tymoshenko vs Boyko

Tymoshenko vs Hrytsenko

Tymoshenko vs Vakarchuk

Tymoshenko vs Murayev

Hrytsenko vs Boyko

Hrytsenko vs Vakarshuk

Regional polls

Donetsk Oblast

Luhansk Oblast

Kharkiv Oblast

Kyiv Oblast

Odesa Oblast

Lviv Oblast

See also
 Opinion polling for the 2019 Ukrainian parliamentary election
 Opinion polling for the next Ukrainian presidential election

References

Presidential elections in Ukraine
2019 elections in Ukraine
2019
Ukraine